Domingarh railway station is located in the city of Gorakhpur Surajkund in the Indian state of Uttar Pradesh. It was constructed in 1995. It serves the demand of local passengers on this route of North Eastern Railway.

The station offers Class B railway station facilities. The station is 6 km from Gorakhpur. It is one of the ten railway stations of Gorakhpur and the third-largest among them. Now after electrification of Gorakhpur–Gonda–Lucknow section Railway Board announced that the station must need remodeling to decrease the high load of trains at Gorakhpur Junction.

History

The  metre-gauge Gorakhpur–Gonda loop, running between Gorakhpur and Gonda, was constructed by North Eastern Railway between 1979 and 1995.

Passenger movement
Domingarh is amongst top five hundred booking stations of Indian Railway. in nearby future it become able to handed most trains of Gorakhpur according to Railway Board and North Eastern Railway. At first Domingarh station hold passenger trains only and after that Express trains which are currently running from Gorakhpur Railway Station among all of them some are expected to run from Domingarh after receiving budget for this from Railway Board.

See also
Gorakhpur Junction railway station
Lucknow Junction railway station
Purvanchal
Gorakhpur Cantonment railway station

References

Railway stations in Gorakhpur district
Lucknow NER railway division
Railway stations opened in 1995
1995 establishments in Uttar Pradesh
Railway stations in Gorakhpur